The East Asiatic Building is a historic building in Bangkok's Bang Rak District. It sits on the eastern bank of the Chao Phraya River, opposite the Oriental Hotel on Soi Charoen Krung 40 and adjacent to the Catholic Mission and Assumption Cathedral. The building was built c. 1900 in Renaissance Revival style to designs by Annibale Rigotti, and served as the headquarters of the East Asiatic Company (Thailand) until 1995. The building is well-conserved, and received the ASA Architectural Conservation Award in 1984. Nowadays, it is used as a commercial event space, administrated by Charoenkrung Studio, and is often rented as a filming location. The building is generally closed to the public, but was opened to visitors in November 2018 when it was one of the venues for the Bangkok Art Biennale.

See also
 Asiatique, a night market renovated situated in the former docks of the EAC
 Banque de l'Indochine, whose 1908 branch building is adjacent

References

Buildings and structures in Bangkok
Renaissance Revival architecture in Thailand
Bang Rak district
Buildings and structures on the Chao Phraya River